Anne Kearney is an American chef and restaurateur.

Kearney describes her cooking with the motto "Food of Love". With a background at Bistro at the Maison de Ville and Peristyle with John Neal and as line cook and culinary assistant at Emeril Lagasse's Emeril's, she was given the opportunity to purchase Peristyle from Neal's estate in 1995. She rose to national recognition and later was honored in 2002 with a James Beard Foundation award as "Southeast Regional Best Chef". Kearney's food is an American interpretation of Provençal bistro fare.

Biography
Kearney earned her toque at the Greater Cincinnati Culinary Arts Academy. Five years after graduation she visited New Orleans for Mardi Gras celebration she left her home state of Ohio for New Orleans. In New Orleans, she worked at Mr. B's bistro, then at Bistro at the Maison de Ville hotel under John Neal; in 1991, she followed Neal to Peristyle.  After Neal died, the 27-year old Kearney bought Peristyle from his estate.

Kearney credits her stint as sous-chef there for the development of her classic French cooking techniques.  The flair for the flavors of New Orleans evolved during her three years with Emeril Lagasse, where she did everything from cooking on the line and developing cookbook recipes to researching and writing Emeril's television show scripts.  Kearney returned to Peristyle as its chef and proprietor shortly after Neal died.

In 2004, Kearney sold Peristyle and moved back to Ohio.  She cultivated and worked on Two Small Tomatoes, her all-natural organic garden.

On November 27, 2007, Kearney opened Rue Dumaine in Washington Township, Ohio. "Rue Dumaine" was the street on which Peristyle was located. Rue Dumaine has gone on to win both awards and recognition for their food.

In July 2017, following the sale of the property where her restaurant was located, Kearney closed Rue Dumaine to pursue other culinary adventures.

In February 2019, she was approached by restaurateurs John and Trudy Cooper to be the executive chef & partner of Oak & Ola, a "Euro-American" restaurant located in Tampa, Florida. Further expanding her love of French ingredients and flavor profiles to the surrounding countries of Italy, Germany, Spain, England, Belgium and beyond.

Awards 
2012: James Beard Foundation Award Finalist: Best Chef, Great Lakes Region 
2011: OpenTable Diners' Choice Awards 
2010: Zagat "Extraordinary to Perfection" 
2002: James Beard Foundation Award Winner: Best Chef, Southeast Region 
2001: James Beard Foundation Award Finalist: Best Chef, Southeast Region 
1999: James Beard Foundation Award Finalist: Best Chef, Southeast Region 
1998: Food & Wine pictured Kearney on the cover of its "10 Best New Chefs in America" issue
1998: Gourmet included Peristyle among its Top Food in New Orleans selections
1997: Nominee for Gallo of Sonoma Rising Star Chef Award

References 

American women restaurateurs
American restaurateurs
Living people
American women chefs
James Beard Foundation Award winners
1967 births
21st-century American women